Ticketing and Reservation System (TRS, 铁路客票发售和预订系统) is software used for rail ticketing in China Railways. The first release was in 1996. As of December 2009, the version in use was version 5.2. It was named SMART before (excluding) version 4.0.

References

Passenger rail transport in China